Dinamic Coruia is a Romanian oina team in the National Senior Championship.

References

Oina teams